The New York Junior Football Championship is a Gaelic football competition for teams affiliated to the New York (New York GAA) board of the Gaelic Athletic Association. These teams are not good enough to play in the New York Senior Football Championship. The winners will usually play senior in the year after winning this championship.

Roll of Honor

Junior B Football Championship

References

Gaelic 2 Championship